"Me and My Guitar" is a song performed by Belgian singer-songwriter Tom Dice from his debut album Teardrops. The song was written by British singer-songwriter Ashley Hicklin, writer-producer Jeroen Swinnen and Tom Dice himself. It took first place in the Eurovision Song Contest 2010 Semi-final 1 on 25 May and was the first Belgian act to qualify for the final since the introduction of the semi-finals in Eurovision. In the final Tom Dice scored 143 points and finished 6th.

Track listing

Credits and personnel
 Lead vocals – Tom Dice
 Record producer – Jeroen Swinnen
 Music – Jeroen Swinnen, Tom Dice, Ashley Hicklin
 Lyrics –  Jeroen Swinnen, Tom Dice, Ashley Hicklin
 Label: SonicAngel

Charts performance

Certifications

See also
Ultratop 40 number-one hits of 2010
Ultratop 50 number-one hits of 2010

References

External links
 Official music video – YouTube

Eurovision songs of 2010
Eurovision songs of Belgium
Ultratop 50 Singles (Wallonia) number-one singles
Ultratop 50 Singles (Flanders) number-one singles
2010 singles
Tom Dice songs
Songs written by Ashley Hicklin
Songs written by Tom Dice
2010 songs
Songs written by Jeroen Swinnen